Anecdota may refer to:
The Anecdota or Secret History of Procopius
Hence an anecdote
Anecdota (album), 2004 release by Lucid Druid

Anecdota also appears in the title of many books, especially history or memoirs.